Molopostola is a genus of moths in the family Gelechiidae.

Species
 Molopostola calumnias Meyrick, 1926
 Molopostola rufitecta Meyrick, 1920

References

Gelechiinae